Jayne Westbury (born 1957) is an English female former track and road cyclist.

Cycling career
Westbury became a British road race champion, winning the road race title in 1975. She was also a three time runner-up to Faith Murray in the British National Individual Sprint Championships at the British National Track Championships in 1972, 1973 and 1974.

References

1957 births
British female cyclists
British track cyclists
Living people